Ni Ni Khin Zaw (born 31 August 1991) is a Burmese pop singer. She is the 2008 winner at The Best of Melody World, a televised singing competition. She performed in the opening and closing ceremonies of the 2013 Southeast Asian Games in Naypyidaw.

Early life and education
She was born on 31 August 1991 in Yekyi, Myanmar. She attended and graduated from the University of Medicine 2, Yangon.

Career 
She started her music career participating as a contestant in Melody World, a televised singing competition. She won the 2008 Melody World and got her big break after competing in the competition. Until 2012, she did not have a debut album of her own after starting her career as a singer in music industry. During the years between 2008 and 2012, she continued her higher education, studied hard to become a doctor and on the other hand, followed her natural bent in Music. She became famous and accepted by audience as a new singer when The Best of Melody World 2008 album was leaked. In that album, she had recorded three solo songs and one collaboration. The three solos she performed were Enemy, in Burmese "ရန်သူ", Although we're far away, in Burmese "အဝေးရောက်နေပါသော်လည်း" and Stop, in Burmese "ရပ်". These solo songs interpret a powerful debut and made Ni Ni Khin Zaw popular among the whole country. In short, she began her career quite well. Then, all other famous singers in Myanmar realized her brilliant talent and great passion in music. Her collaborated song as a featuring artist with Nine One, a well-known Burmese rapper, named "Don't colour", in Burmese "အရောင်မဆိုးနဲ့". This song had an enormous debut in Myanmar Music Industry with 20M+ Streams and over 15 million pure sale. This song played a crucial role in local radio platforms and FM. And another collaboration is with Bobby Soxer in the album called, ဒုံးပျံ, in English "Rocket". The name of the track is ယုံကြည်လိုက်, in English "Believe it". This song, too, made a wonderful debut in Myanmar during 2012 and became very popular among teenagers. The other popular debuts of Ni Ni Khin Zaw are မိုးတိမ်ကဗျာ, in English "Cloud Poem", collaborated with Yatha, a well-known Burmese Rapper, ထာဝရသူငယ်ချင်း, in English "Best Friends Forever", collaborated with Hlwan Paing, a famous male singer in Myanmar, မွေးနေ့လက်ဆောင်များ, in English "Birthday Presents", မပြောင်းလဲနိုင်တဲ့အချစ်, in English "A Love that will never change" and so many songs. She presented her first one lady show in Yangon on 1 April 2017. 
She presented her very first REDvolution Show on 1 April 2017.
She presented her Retro REDvolution Show, second one lady show on 7 and 8 April 2018.
She presented her Party REDvolution Show, third one lady show on 2 November 2019 and also performed this party-themed REDvolution Show again in Singapore on 30 November 2019.

Ni Ni Khin Zaw has served as a coach on three seasons of The Voice Myanmar.

Honours and awards 

 Winner at The Best of Melody World, 2008
 1st Runner Up at ASEAN Song Contest 2017
 The Best Pop Song of the Year 2014 in Myanmar Music Awards (MMA) : "Myaw Lint Chet Ta Sone Ta Yar" in Burmese Language which means "Hope For Something" in English
 The Most Popular Song of the Year 2013 (Shwe FM) by "Myaw Lint Chet Ta Sone Ta Yar"
The Most Requested Song from Facebook of the Year 2013 (Shwe FM) by "Thit Sar Ma Pyet Kyay" in Burmese Language which means "Be Faithful" in English
The Best Song of Monsoon 2014 (Myanmar Music Awards, MMA) by "Myaw Lint Chet Ta Sone Ta Yar"
The Best Pop Song of Monsoon 2014 - Artists' Choice (MMA, 2014) by "Myaw Lint Chet Ta Sone Ta Yar"
The Best Renew Song of the Year 2014 – Artists' Choice (MMA) by "Inlay Mhar Ywar Tae Moe" in Burmese Language which means "Rain in Inlay Lake" in English
The Best Pop Singer of the Year 2014 (MMA)
The Most Popular Female Vocalist of the Year 2014 (City FM)
The Most Popular Female Vocalist of the Year 2015 (City FM)
The Best Selling Studio Music Album Female Vocalist of the Year 2015 (City FM)
The Most Popular Female Vocalist of the Year 2016 (City FM)
The Most Popular Female Vocalist of the Year 2018 (City FM)

Major M Music Awards 2018

Top Artist Award at Major M Music Awards 2019 
Top Artist Award by JOOX Music Platform
Best in Music at Myanmar's Pride Awards (MPA)
The Most Popular Female Artist of the year 2020 (City FM)

Discography

Albums 
Mario (2013)
Red (2015)
U (2017)
Party Khin Zaw (2019)

Mini albums 
Summer (2019)
After an iconic release of her 2nd Studio Album "Red" which is the greatest album of all time in Myanmar, she faced a lot of criticisms and personal attacks because of the bad news about she married an old business man and she concealed these backgrounds to make her artist career shine.Later she clarified that the marriage was real but made her successful career on her owns.Although her second studio album RED was leaked, it became her commercially and critically successful album.Until today, she really is one of the most successful artists in Myanmar and still keeps her career peak as usual by enhancing her music creativity.

Personal life
Ni Ni Khin Zaw married Myo Myint Thein, a merchant vessel chief engineer and widower, on 10 June 2010. The couple divorced in 2013.

References

External links

Official Website

21st-century Burmese women singers
Living people
21st-century Burmese physicians
Burmese women physicians
1991 births
Burmese women in business
Burmese pop singers
People from Ayeyarwady Region
University of Medicine 2, Yangon alumni
Melody World participants
Burmese businesspeople